Charles James Stewart (13 or 16 April 1775 – 13 July 1837) was an English Church of England, clergyman, bishop, and politician. He was the second Bishop of Quebec from 1826 to 1837, and in connection with this was appointed to the Legislative Council of Lower Canada.

Born in London, England, the third surviving son of John Stewart, 7th Earl of Galloway, and his second wife, Anne Dashwood, Stewart was a member of Corpus Christi College, Oxford when he graduated Bachelor of Arts in 1795 and a fellow of All Souls College, Oxford when this matured to an M.A. in 1799. He was ordained to the Anglican ministry in the diaconate in December 1798 and to the priesthood in May 1799. From 1799 to 1826, he was Rector of Orton Longueville in Cambridgeshire. In 1807, he arrived in Lower Canada as a missionary, settling in Montreal. He soon moved to Saint-Armand and helped to build Trinity Church, Frelighsburg, the first regular place of Anglican worship in the Eastern Townships. In 1826, he was appointed Bishop of Quebec. He died in London in 1837, and is buried there in  Kensal Green Cemetery.

References

 
 

1775 births
1837 deaths
Anglican clergy from London
Alumni of Corpus Christi College, Oxford
Anglican bishops of Quebec
Burials at Kensal Green Cemetery
19th-century Anglican Church of Canada bishops
Fellows of All Souls College, Oxford
Members of the Legislative Council of Lower Canada
Anglophone Quebec people
Younger sons of earls